Mark Thomas (born 23 July 1983 in Stockport) is an English professional ice hockey player, currently retired after playing for Sheffield Steelers.  Thomas began his professional career in 2002, playing for the Haringey Racers in the ENIL.  Thomas took up ice hockey much later than most players but was able to thrive due to his natural talent and physical abilities.  Thomas began playing ice hockey at Under-19 after watching his local team, the now-defunct Manchester Storm, then playing in the ISL.

Thomas would start with a strong showing in his first season, when he played in 22 games and totalled 63 penalty minutes as well as helping out the offence with seven points.  For the start of the 2003–04 season Thomas was a Telford Wildfoxes player, but played just once before being snapped up by then Manchester Phoenix head coach, Rick Brebant to play for the Phoenix in their debut season.  The Phoenix had been established following the collapse of the Storm, the team that had inspired Thomas to start to play ice hockey in the first place.

Thomas was an important part of the Phoenix's first season and played in 52 EIHL regular season games and featured six times in the play-offs. The Phoenix organisation was suspended in 2004 due to off ice problems and so Thomas was forced into moving.  In the summer of 2004 he chose to sign for the London Racers, where he stayed for a season-and-a-half.  It was financial problems that again forced Thomas to move, with the Racers franchise folding mid-way through the 2005–06 season.

This mid-season move brought Thomas to sign for the Sheffield Steelers, arch-rivals of the Phoenix whom Thomas had played for just two years earlier.  Thomas established himself as a key part of the Steelers defence, and was a rare British star player surrounded by foreign imports.  It was that consistency that saw "Tomo" remain a fan favourite with the Steelers organisation for 10 seasons, and in 2015, he was rewarded with a testimonial season.

Various events were held in his testimonial year, including a testimonial match which saw many former Steelers, including Scott Basiuk and Steve Munn, return to Sheffield.

On 6 May 2015, it was announced that Mark Thomas was returning to his home town team, the EPL's Manchester Phoenix, who he had previously played for in their inaugural season in 2003–04.

External links

Mark Thomas Personal Profile, Manchester Phoenix Official Website
Mark Thomas Personal Profile, Sheffield Steelers Official Website

1983 births
Living people
English ice hockey defencemen
London Racers players
Manchester Phoenix players
Sheffield Steelers players